Ozan Can Kökçü (born 8 August 1998) is a professional footballer who plays as a midfielder for Eerste Divisie club Eindhoven. Born in the Netherlands, he represents the Azerbaijan national team.

Club career

Bursaspor
On 29 March 2017, Ozan Kökçü signed a four-year contract with Bursaspor. Kökçü made his debut for Bursaspor in the Turkish Cup match against Yeni Altındağ Belediyespor in a 0–0 away draw on 26 October 2017.

Loan to Waalwijk
On 28 December 2017, RKC Waalwijk announced the signing of Ozan Kökçü on a season-long loan deal. He made his Eerste Divisie debut for Waalwijk in a 1–0 home victory against Jong AZ on 12 January 2018. He scored his first goal for the club on 6 April 2018, in the 4th minute of a 3–1 loss against Oss. Kökçü scored 1 goals and 3 assists in 14 matches during the 2017–18 season.

Giresunspor
On 2 August 2018, Kökçü signed a three-year contract with TFF First League side Giresunspor.

He made his league debut for Giresunspor in a 3–1 home victory against Eskişehirspor on 12 August 2018.

Sabah
On 21 August 2019, Kökçü signed a two-year contract with Azerbaijan Premier League side Sabah. On 13 January 2021, he was sent on a six-month loan to Telstar in the Dutch second-tier Eerste Divisie.

Telstar
In August 2021, Kökçü signed a two-year permanent deal with Telstar.

Eindhoven
Kökçü joined Eindhoven on 6 August 2022, signing a two-year contract with an option for an additional year.

International career
Kökçü was called up and played for the Azerbaijan U21 in a 2019 UEFA European Under-21 Championship qualification match against Israel U21 on 31 August 2017.

Personal life
Kökçü is of Turkish and Azerbaijani descent. He is the older brother of the professional footballer Orkun Kökçü, who plays for Feyenoord and is an international footballer for Turkey.

In January 2021 Kökçü married his long-term girlfriend Sevil in the Netherlands.

Career statistics

References

External links
 
 RKC Waalwijk profile
 AFFA profile
 

1998 births
Living people
Footballers from Haarlem
Association football midfielders
Citizens of Azerbaijan through descent
Azerbaijani footballers
Azerbaijan youth international footballers
Azerbaijan under-21 international footballers
Azerbaijan international footballers
Dutch footballers
Dutch people of Azerbaijani descent
Dutch people of Turkish descent
Azerbaijani people of Turkish descent
Azerbaijani people of Dutch descent
Azerbaijani expatriate footballers
Expatriate footballers in Turkey
Azerbaijani expatriate sportspeople in Turkey
Eerste Divisie players
TFF First League players
Azerbaijan Premier League players
FC Groningen players
Feyenoord players
Bursaspor footballers
RKC Waalwijk players
Giresunspor footballers
Sabah FC (Azerbaijan) players
SC Telstar players
FC Eindhoven players